Henk Sneevlietweg is an Amsterdam Metro station in the south-west Amsterdam, Netherlands. The station opened in 1997 and is located in the suburb of Nieuw-West is served by line 50 and line 51. Henk Sneevlietweg opened on 28 May 1997.

The station is elevated above street level on a railway embankment. The station is named after the street on which its main entrance is located which, in turn, is named after Dutch politician Henk Sneevliet.

Metro services
50 Isolatorweg - Sloterdijk - Lelylaan - Zuid - RAI - Duivendrecht - Bijlmer ArenA - Holendrecht - Gein
51 Isolatorweg - Sloterdijk - Lelylaan - Zuid - RAI - Amsterdam Amstel - Central Station

Bus services
62 Station Lelylaan - Sloten - Hoofddorpplein - Haarlemmermeer - Stadionplein - VU - Zuid - Buitenveldert - RAI - Station Amstel
68 Henk Sneevlietweg - IBM - Riekerpolder

Amsterdam Metro stations
Rail transport in Amsterdam
Railway stations opened in 1997